The OMI cryptograph was a rotor cipher machine produced and sold by Italian firm Ottico Meccanica Italiana (OMI) in Rome.

The machine had seven rotors, including a reflecting rotor. The rotors stepped regularly. Each rotor could be assembled from two sections with different wiring: one section consisted of a "frame" containing ratchet notches, as well as some wiring, while the other section consisted of a "slug" with a separate wiring. The slug section fitted into the frame section, and different slugs and frames could be interchanged with each other. As a consequence, there were many permutations for the rotor selection.

The machine was offered for sale during the 1960s.

References

 Cipher A. Deavours and Louis Kruh, "Machine Cryptography and Modern Cryptanalysis", Artech House, 1985, pp. 146–147
 F. L. Bauer, Decrypted Secrets, 2nd edition, Springer-Verlag, 2000, pp. 112,136.

Cryptographic hardware
Rotor machines